Jusu Karvonen (born 17 January 1993) is a Finnish footballer, who currently plays for FC Haka on loan from Taranto Calcio.

Career

On his debut season Karvonen played in 12 games Veikkausliiga at the age of 16. He also played 3 Finnish Cup games. Karvonen has had trials with Serie A giants F.C. Internazionale Milano. In December 2009 Karvonen joined Atalanta B.C.'s training camp. In January 2011 he moved to the youth team of the Serie A club A.C. Cesena, on loan from Taranto Calcio.

Karvonen has represented Finnish U-17 national football team.

References
Guardian Football

Living people
1991 births
Finnish footballers
Tampere United players
Taranto F.C. 1927 players
A.C. Cesena players
Finnish expatriate footballers
Expatriate footballers in Italy
Association football midfielders
Footballers from Tampere